Eastern Football Club was a 19th-century football club based in Glasgow, Scotland. They were one of the founder members of the Scottish Football Association (SFA) and one of the sixteen teams to participate in the inaugural season of the Scottish Cup.

History
Eastern were formed in 1872 by members of the original Thistle F.C. club.  The club's first game, at Fleshers' Haughs, took place on 25 January 1873, against a Celtic football club, and ended in a 4-0 win to Eastern, although the Celtic goalkeeper claimed the score was merely 3-0.

Eastern one of the eight clubs that agreed to form the SFA in March that year. Eastern participated in Scottish Cup tournaments between 1873–74 and 1876–77, reaching the quarter-finals on the first two occasions.

A member of Eastern FC, James McIntyre was selected to referee the first Scottish Cup final between Queen's Park and Clydesdale on 21 March 1874.

The club's final Cup tie was against Alexandra Athletic F.C. in 1876.  The clubs in the first game, and Eastern won the second 2-0, but the Athletes protested on the basis that the referee who took charge of the match had not been agreed beforehand; ironically, this was down to Eastern objecting to the Alexandra nominee, but Eastern called the protest "a mean subterfuge to attempt to wrest the honours which have already been fairly won".  Perhaps as a result of the Scottish FA acceding to the protest, and the Athletes winning the third match, Eastern does not seem to have played football again, with members instead joining the Clyde club.

Second club

A second Eastern club from Glasgow was founded in 1885, playing at Springfield Park and wearing navy shirts and white shorts.  It seems to have existed for just one season.

Colours
The club played in royal blue and scarlet shirts with blue knickerbockers.

Stadium
The club's first ground was Fleshers' Haugh on Glasgow Green.  In 1875, the club moved to Barrowfield Park, which was also known informally as Glengarry Park, after the open space next to the roped-off area.  It was immediately to the east of the Barrowfield print works and considered short at 130 yards.

Notable players

During its relatively short time, Eastern provided Scotland with some of its early international players, with John Hunter, Peter Andrews and Sandy Kennedy representing Scotland on a number of occasions.

References

 
Defunct football clubs in Scotland
Football clubs in Glasgow
Association football clubs established in 1873
Association football clubs disestablished in 1885
1873 establishments in Scotland
1885 disestablishments in Scotland
Scottish Football Association founder members
Bridgeton–Calton–Dalmarnock